Goran Mitevski was the fifth director of the Administration for Security and Counterintelligence  of Macedonia.

References

 

Macedonian politicians
Living people
1966 births